The 703rd Strategic Missile Wing is an inactive United States Air Force unit.  It was last assigned to Strategic Air Command's 13th Air Division at Lowry Air Force Base, Colorado.   It was Strategic Air Command's first Titan I wing, but never achieved full operational status.  It was inactivated on 1 July 1961 and its assets transferred to another wing.

History
The 703rd was the first HGM-25A Titan I Intercontinental ballistic missile wing.  It was activated on 25 September 1958, but never became fully operational.  Partial capability was achieved on 10 December 1958, with training on the operation of the Titan I ICBM until March 1960.

The missiles, personnel and facilities of the wing were reassigned to the 451st Strategic Missile Wing on 1 July 1961 and the unit was inactivated.

Lineage
 Established as 703rd Strategic Missile Wing (ICBM-Titan) on 5 September 1958
 Activated on 25 September 1958
 Discontinued and inactivated on 1 July 1961
 Consolidated with the 303rd Fighter Wing on 31 July 1985 as the 503rd Tactical Missile Wing

Assignments
 1st Missile Division, 25 September 1958
 Fifteenth Air Force, 15 January 1959
 13th Air Division, 1 July 1959 – 1 July 1961

Components
 848th Strategic Missile Squadron: 1 February 1960 – 1 July 1961
 849th Strategic Missile Squadron:  1 August 1960 – 1 July 1961

Stations
 Lowry Air Force Base, Colorado, 25 September 1958 – 1 July 1961

Missiles
 HGM-25A Titan I

References

Notes

Bibliography

 

Military units and formations established in 1958
703
1958 establishments in the United States